Siddhartha or Siddharth is the birth name of the founder of Buddhism, Gautama Buddha.

Siddhartha may also refer to:

Books
 Siddhartha (novel), about a fictional contemporary of the Buddha, by Hermann Hesse

Film and TV
 Siddhartha (1972 film), a 1972 American film
 Sidhartha (1998 film), a 1998 Indian Malayalam film
 Siddharth (2013 film), a 2013 Indian-Canadian film
 Siddhartha (2015 film), a 2015 Indian Kannada film

Music
 Siddharta (band), a Slovenian rock band
 Siddhartha (band), an American rock band
 Siddhartha (opera), opera by Per Nørgård 
 Siddhartha (1976), orchestral suite by Claude Vivier (1948-1983)
 Siddhartha (musical), a 2007 original production by Chu Un Temple and BLIA Cebu
 "Siddhartha", a song by Jerry Cantrell on the album Degradation Trip Volumes 1 & 2
 "Siddhartha", a song by Art Farmer from Crawl Space

Organisations
 Siddhartha University, the first and the only Buddhist university in Nepal

People

Given name
 Sidharto Suryodipuro, Indonesian Ambassador to India since 2017
 Siddhartha of Kundagrama, father of Mahavira (24th Jain Tirthankara)
 Siddharth (actor) (born 1979), Indian actor
 Siddhartha (musician), Mexican musician
 Siddharth Anand, Indian film director
 Siddhartha Basu, Indian quiz master
 Sidharth Bharathan (born 1983), Malayalam film actor
 Siddharth Chandekar, Indian Marathi actor
 Siddhartha Deb (born 1970), Indian author
 Siddharth Gupta, Indian actor
 Siddharth Haldipur, music director and composer
 Siddhartha Jadhav (born 1981), Marathi film actor
 Siddharth Kak, Indian documentary maker, television producer and presenter
 Siddharth Koirala, film actor
 Siddharth Lama (born 1985), Nepali film actor
 Sidharth Malhotra (born 1985), Indian film actor
 Siddharth Mallya (born 1987), Indian-American aspiring actor
 Siddharth Mahadevan, Indian playback singer and composer
 Siddharth Menon (actor) (born 1989), Indian actor
 Siddharth Menon (born 1989), Indian playback singer  
 Siddharth Nigam (born 2000), Indian teen actor
 Siddhartha Mukherjee (born 1970), winner of 2011 Pulitzer Prize for General Nonfiction
 Siddharth Ray (1963-2004), Indian film actor
 Siddharth Sanghvi (born 1977), Indian author
 Siddhartha Shankar Ray (1920–2010), Indian politician belonging to the Indian National Congress
 Siddharth Nath Singh, Indian politician
 Sidhartha Siva (born 1985), Malayalam film actor, director and scenarist
 Sidharth Shukla (born 1980-2021), Indian film actor
 Siddharth Sinha (born 1978), Indian film maker
 Siddharth Suchde (born 1985), professional squash player from India
 Siddharth Trivedi (born 1982), Indian cricketer who represents Gujarat
 Siddharth Varadarajan (born 1965), Strategic Affairs Editor of The Hindu and editor of Gujarat: The Making of a Tragedy
 Siddharth Venugopal (born 1985), actor

Surname
 Manimaran Siddharth (born 1998), Indian cricketer
Nikhil Siddharth (born 1985), actor in the Telugu film industry in India

Fictional characters 
 Siddharth aka Appu, main protagonist in Raajakumara, portrayed by Puneeth Rajkumar
 Siddhartha “Sid” Pakam, a character in the Netflix series  Grand Army

Other
 SIDDHARTA, an experiment at DAFNE electron–positron collider in Italy